Gold Mountain ("Gam Saan" in Cantonese, often rendered in English as Gum Shan or Gumshan) is a commonly used nickname for San Francisco, California, and historically used broadly by Chinese to refer to western regions of North America, including British Columbia, Canada. After gold was found in the Sierra Nevada in 1848, thousands of Chinese from Toisan in Guangdong, began to travel to the West in search of gold and riches during the California Gold Rush.

Chinese people historically referred to California and British Columbia as Gold Mountain, as evidenced by maps and returned Overseas Chinese. However, as a gold rush subsequently occurred in Australia, Bendigo in the then-colony of Victoria was referred to as "New Gold Mountain" (新金山), and California became known as Old Gold Mountain; although "Old Gold Mountain" now specifically refers to San Francisco.

History
The name "Gold Mountain" was initially applied to California.  Ships full of immigrants docked in San Francisco to disembark passengers, initially bound for the gold fields, but later to remain in the growing Chinese settlement in San Francisco.  In the latter part of the 19th century, however, British Columbia also came to be referred to as "Gold Mountain" following the discovery of gold in the Fraser Canyon in the 1857 and the subsequent group of Chinese from San Francisco arriving by boat in June 1858, and further Chinese settlers coming from California and directly from China later on to British Columbia (which they also referred to as "The Colonies of T'ang" i.e. China). The term thus broadened to mean "Western North America". The gold seekers in British Columbia first went to the Chinatown in Victoria, on the Colony of Vancouver Island, to obtain supplies. Victoria was the dominant political and economic centre before the economic ascendancy of Vancouver (which has its own Chinatown), and remains the official seat of political power in British Columbia today.

Following California Gold Rush, Australian gold rushes began in 1851, making Australia the 'New Gold Mountain', also refers to Melbourne; Sydney became 'Sydney Gold Mountain'.

See also
Chinese-Americans in the California Gold Rush
Chinese migration
History of Chinese immigration to Canada
Altai Mountains (Jin Shan)

References

Hasley, Karen J.: "Gold Mountain" (Denver, CO: Outskirts Press, 2012) a work of fiction describing this time in history

External links
"Escape to Gold Mountain: A Graphic History of the Chinese in North America" by David H.T. Wong. 2012.
Overview of Chinese immigrants during California Gold Rush
"Gold Mountain" from The Concubine's Children by Denise Chong. Accessed: 2006-04-09.
"Chinese transformed 'Gold Mountain'" by Stephen Magagnini, San Francisco Chronicle, January 18, 1998.  Accessed: 2006-04-09.
Chinese and Westward Expansion from The Chinese in California, 1850-1925. University of California, Berkeley/Library of Congress.  Accessed: 2006-04-09.

Chinese diaspora
Chinese-American history
California Gold Rush
History of British Columbia